Santiago "Santi" Vila i Vicente (born 15 March 1973) is a Catalan historian and politician from Granollers, Spain. He was a member of the Catalan European Democratic Party, and was a councillor at Figueres from 1999 before becoming mayor from 2007 to 2012.

On 2 November 2017 members of the Generalitat de Catalunya were arrested for sedition, unlike the others Vila was offered bail of €50,000 as he had resigned before the Catalan unilateral declaration of independence. He was pre-trial jailed just a night. The trial began on 12 February 2019 and was remitted to decision on 12 June 2019.

On 14 October 2019, Vila was sentenced to a year and 8 months of disqualification and a fine of €60.000 for disobedience.

See also
2017–18 Spanish constitutional crisis
Trial of Catalonia independence leaders

References

1973 births
Catalan prisoners and detainees
Culture ministers of Catalonia
Gay politicians
LGBT legislators in Spain
Living people
Mayors of places in Catalonia
Municipal councillors in the province of Girona
People from Granollers
Prisoners and detainees of Spain
People barred from public office
Spanish politicians convicted of crimes